The 1986 Trans-Am Series was the 21st running of the Sports Car Club of America's premier series. Mercury saw its final Trans Am victories in 1986, not counting the Merkur brand which would continue to dominate the series for a few years thereafter.

Results

Championship standings (Top 20)

References

Trans-Am Series
Trans-Am